Strange Creatures may refer to:

Strange Creatures (band)
"Strange Creatures", song by Jake Bugg from Shangri La
"Strange Creatures", song by The Undead from Til Death
 Strange Creatures (album), a 2019 album by Drenge